Husiev, or Husieva (feminine), is a Ukrainian surname.

Notable people with the name include:

 Oleh Husiev (born 1983), Ukrainian footballer
 Iryna Husieva (born 1987), Ukrainian judoka
 Serhiy Husyev (born 1967), Ukrainian footballer

Ukrainian-language surnames
Patronymic surnames